George Paterson may refer to:

George Paterson (businessman) (1845–1939), founder of United Kingdom' soap manufacturers PZ Cussons
George Paterson (footballer, born 1900) (1900–1949), Scottish footballer for Stoke City
George Paterson (footballer, born 1914) (1914–1985), Scottish international footballer for Celtic
George Paterson (footballer, born 1916) (1916–1996), Scottish football defender for Liverpool
George Paterson (rower) (born 1940), former New Zealand rower
George C. Paterson (1891–1945), American football player and engineer

See also
George Patterson (disambiguation)